Vegetable Duck is a 1944 detective novel by John Rhode, the pen name of the British writer Cecil Street. It is the fortieth in his long-running series of novels featuring Lancelot Priestley, a Golden Age armchair detective.  The title refers to a dish including a Marrow stuffed with minced beef, which features in the plot. It has been described as "one of the oddest titles for a detective novel in the genre". Although written during wartime, the setting was post-war. It was published in America by Dodd Mead under the alternative title Too Many Suspects.

Synopsis
At the London service flat where she lives with her husband, dies after eating a meal which later analysis shows was infused with digitalis. Scotland Yard at first suspect her husband, who had been called away by a telephone call of murdering her. However, with the assistance of Priestley, the investigating officer is able to prove this is a long-premeditated crime by someone else.

References

Bibliography
 Herbert, Rosemary. Whodunit?: A Who's Who in Crime & Mystery Writing. Oxford University Press, 2003.
 Magill, Frank Northen . Critical Survey of Mystery and Detective Fiction: Authors, Volume 4. Salem Press, 1988.
 Reilly, John M. Twentieth Century Crime & Mystery Writers. Springer, 2015.

1944 British novels
Novels by Cecil Street
British crime novels
British mystery novels
British thriller novels
British detective novels
Collins Crime Club books
Novels set in London